Peter Constantine (born 1963) is a British and American literary translator who has translated literary works from German, Russian, French, Modern Greek, Ancient Greek, Italian, Albanian, Dutch, and Slovene.

Biography
Constantine was born in London to an Austrian mother and a British father of Turkish and Greek descent.  He grew up in Athens, Greece before moving to the United States in 1983. In his first books, Japanese Street Slang and Japanese Slang: Uncensored he explored Japanese slang and criminal jargons in their many varieties, focusing on aspects of the Japanese language that had been traditionally marginalised. "Previously unprintable things that will inform, amuse, shock and maybe even disgust"  (Joseph LaPenta: Daily Yomiuri, 6 December 1992).

In the early 1990s, Constantine began translating short stories and poetry from various European languages, publishing in literary magazines in the United States, Britain, and Australia.  Since the publication of his first book-length translation, Thomas Mann: Six Early Stories, he has worked almost exclusively as a literary translator.

Contemporary Authors quotes Constantine: "I have always been interested in language in all its aspects. Working with master linguists such as Thomas Mann, Chekhov, Dostoevsky, and Babel has been particularly rewarding for me, since these writers push language to an extreme, and the translator has to vigorously mold the translation in order to try to recreate their effects."

Honors
In 1998, Constantine received the PEN/Book-of-the-Month Club Translation Prize for his translation of Thomas Mann's Six Early Stories. It was chosen by The New York Times as a Notable Book of the Year.  In 1999 he was awarded the National Translation Award for The Undiscovered Chekhov: Thirty-Eight New Stories.  In 2002, Constantine's translation of The Complete Works of Isaac Babel, edited by Nathalie Babel, received a Koret Jewish Book Award and a National Jewish Book Award citation. His translation of the modern Greek poet Stylianos Harkianakis's poetry book Mother received the 2004–2005 Hellenic Association of Translators of Literature Prize. In 2007 Constantine was the recipient of the Helen and Kurt Wolff Translator's Prize for his translation of Benjamin Lebert's novel The Bird Is a Raven.  His translation of The Essential Writings of Machiavelli was a finalist for the 2008 PEN/Book-of-the-Month Club Translation Prize. Peter Constantine is a 2012 Ellen Maria Gorrissen Berlin Prize Fellow at the American Academy in Berlin. In 2016, Constantine received an honorary doctorate, Doctor of Humane Letters, from the University of Connecticut.

Translator

Author

Editor
 Editor-in-chief, New Poetry in Translation.
  
  
 
 The Caribbean Writer, Volume 12, 1998. Special Section: Poems by Celie Diaquoi Deslandes, edited and translated by Peter Constantine from the French.
 The Caribbean Writer, Volume 10, 1996. Special Section: Surinamese short fiction by Paul Bandel, Hélène Ramjiawan, Anne Zeggen en Monique Pool. Edited and translated by Peter Constantine from the Dutch.

Theatre

Translations and adaptations
Sarah Bernhardt Comes to Town, by Anton Chekhov. Massachusetts International Festival of the Arts and Moving Theater. Directed by Vanessa Redgrave. World Premiere, 2 May 1998.  Performed by Vanessa Redgrave and Rachel Kempson.
Sarah Bernhardt Comes to Town: An Evening of Chekhov, by Anton Chekhov, adapted by Vanessa Redgrave. 7 August 1999.  Directed by Vanessa Redgrave.  Performed by Lynn Redgrave, Rachel Kempson and Vanessa Redgrave.
Maria, by Isaac Babel. Pigott Theater, Stanford. Directed by Carl Weber. Premiere 19 February 2004.
The Mandrake, by Niccolò Machiavelli. The Pearl Theatre, New York. Directed by Jim Calder. Premiere 8 January 2008.
The Oedipus Cycle, by Sophocles. The Pearl Theatre, New York. Directed by Shepard Sobel. Premiere 27 October 2008.

References

External links 

1963 births
English male writers
Writers from London
Literary translators
American translators
British translators
Albanian–English translators
Dutch–English translators
French–English translators
German–English translators
Greek–English translators
Translators from Ancient Greek
Japanese–English translators
Italian–English translators
Russian–English translators
Slovene–English translators
American speculative fiction translators
British speculative fiction translators
Translation awards
Living people